Bangjja, also called yugi, is a Korean type of hand-forged bronzeware. A complete set of bangjja includes dishes, bowls, spoons, and chopsticks. The main difference between Korean bronzeware or bangjja from other bronzeware is the alloy ratio between copper and tin. The bangjja contains much more tin than other bronzewares (Cu:Sn = 78:22 as volume) while the normal ratio of tin to copper is 1/9. Due to this compositional difference, bangjja (unlike other kinds of bronzeware) can be sterilized. For this reason, it has historically been used as tableware for the royal families of Korea. Bangjja is used for the traditional presentation of Korean royal court cuisine (surasang). In 1983, the government of South Korea officially designated bangjjaa as an Important Intangible Cultural Property.

History

Bangjja brassware reflects its deep historical value as well as traditional fashion of Korea. The history of bangjja originates from the Bronze Age and it was widely used to make a variety of tools and tableware. Ordos region's bronze culture related to Scythian Bronze Culture was spread and affected several regions including Korean territory. As the Bronze Age culture in Korea was influenced by Ordos region, where bronze culture was originated from the northern part of Siberia, Korean also produced ceremonial products such as ritual tools with bronze.

During the period of the Goryeo dynasty when they frequently traded with China, royalties and nobles used thin bronze tableware made with bangjja technique.

In the period of Chosun dynasty, the country greatly supported mining and established many brassware plants in local territories. Although, people in this era generally used porcelains, upper-class people continued using brassware like Goryeo period. As time passed, even in the middle class, people started using brassware increasingly and it formed many markets across the country.

In the end of modern age, most of brassware in all households got ravished by Japan. With the liberation in 1945, brassware became widely used again, but soon after Korean War, when briquettes took place, people preferred stainless bowls to brassware because brassware gets easily discolored by briquettes gas.

In reversal, nowadays, through various chemical experiments, bangjja brassware is becoming famous and known for its O-157 sterilization function, anti pathogen, and detection of pesticides. Also its heat retention rate turned out to be higher than porcelains and stainless bowls. Bangjja is currently used for making instruments, tableware, and other various goods such as household supplies.

Characteristics 
When bangjja brassware is made, a mass of alloy of copper and tin is heated with fire and gets hammered several times. The proportion of tin in bangjja brassware is very high compared to general bronze bowls.

First of all, mass of brass nugget is made by alloying copper and tin in ratio of 78:22, which is a golden ratio which permits no error at all. This alloying ratio is not possible in modern metallographic study because in today's practical products, the proportion of tin must be under 10 percent. Surprisingly, though bangjja brassware has to be made with the ratio of 78:22. According to modern theology, the existence of bangjja brassware is unexplainable.

In general, iron becomes more firm when it is quenched after being heated in fire over 1 Celsius nectarine. However, bangjja brassware becomes softer as it gets heated in fire. This is another mystery of brassware. Several people form a united circle around the mass of annoy and start hammering to make a form of plates. One special thing about the process is that they do not use ready-made mold machine, instead they repeat hammering and heating in fire as they are making the shape of brassware.

Today's bangjja 
Bangjja brassware produced by handed down traditional techniques till today are not bent or easily broken. Furthermore, with more usage, it becomes burnished without any discoloration. Recent reports about various experiments revealed that bangjja brassware contains a sterilization function and detects pesticides. Bangjja brassware, now called "bowl of mystery" shows its great heat retention, which is far greater than other tableware made with other materials. It is also commonly used as a material for percussion instruments like the tam-tam, hobnail, and gong. 

Several people form a well organized group to produce bangjja and it requires complicated and highly skilled techniques to be done, which makes bangjja more distinctive. Bangjja products are used not only as simple household supplies, but also as work of art, which depicts the traditional custom of Korea. The value of bangjja brassware is highly respected. Bangjja artisan Lee Bong-Ju, who was appointed as Important Intangible Cultural Property in 1983 is currently maintaining the root of bangjja in South Korea. All of his various masterpieces are now exhibited at Dae-Gu Bangjja Brassware Museum.

References

General information about bangjja

External links
Official site of the Daegu Bangjja Museum
Brief info about bangjja and an artisan
Brief introduction and effects of Bangjja Brassware at 내성유기공방
lacquered brassware at ottmidam

Korean art
Korean cuisine